Erulan Kenjebekuly Jamaubaev (Erūlan Kenjebekūly Jamaubaev; born 25 March 1974) is a Kazakh politician who's serving as Minister of Finance since 2020.

Biography

Early life and education 
Jamaubaev was born in the Almaty Region of Kazakh SSR in 1974. He graduated from the Narxoz University in 1995 and from there was a teacher-trainee and teacher. In 2009, Jamaubaev received an academic degree of Master of Business Administration with a degree in Strategic Management.

Career 
From 1998 to 2006, Jamaubaev was a Leading Analyst, Chief Analyst, Chief Analyst Specialist, Head of department, deputy director of the Research and Statistics Department of the National Bank of Kazakhstan. In 2006, he became the director of the Department of the bank until being appointed as managing director of JSC Housing Construction Savings Bank of Kazakhstan in 2014.

From July 2015, Jamaubaev was the Deputy Head of the Department of Socio-Economic Monitoring of the Administration of the President of the Republic of Kazakhstan until being appointed as the Head of the Department of Socio-Economic Monitoring of the Presidential Administration of Kazakhstan on 2 November 2015.

On 29 November 2018, he was appointed as assistant to the President of Kazakhstan before being relieved and becoming the Executive Secretary of the Ministry of Finance on 22 March 2019.

Since 18 May 2020, he's been serving as a Minister of Finance under Mamin's cabinet.

Since May 4, 2022 — Chairman of the Board of Directors of Damu Entrepreneurship Development Fund JSC

References 

1974 births
Living people
People from Almaty Region
Government ministers of Kazakhstan
Ministers of Finance (Kazakhstan)
Narxoz University alumni